Petlad Junction railway station is a railway station on the Western Railway network in the state of Gujarat, India. Petlad Junction railway station is 21 km far away from Anand railway station. Passenger, DEMU trains halt at Petlad Junction railway station.

See also
 Anand district

References

Railway stations in Anand district
Vadodara railway division
Railway junction stations in Gujarat